Indra Adi Nugraha (born 8 October 1993) is an Indonesian professional footballer who plays as a goalkeeper for Liga 1 club Bhayangkara.

Club career

Bhayangkara FC
He was signed for Bhayangkara to play in Liga 1 in the 2018 season. Indra Nugraha made his league debut on 13 August 2018 in a match against PSIS Semarang at the Moch. Soebroto Stadium, Magelang.

Career statistics

Club

Notes

References

External links
 Indra Adi Nugraha at Soccerway
 Indra Adi Nugraha at Liga Indonesia

1993 births
Living people
Indonesian footballers
Liga 1 (Indonesia) players
Bhayangkara F.C. players
Association football goalkeepers
Sportspeople from East Java